Patrick Desmond "Paddy" Leonard (born 25 July 1929) is an Irish former footballer who played in the Football League as a forward for Bristol Rovers and Colchester United.

Career

Born in Dublin, Leonard began his playing career in England with Bath City. From Bath, he was signed to Football League club Bristol Rovers, where he made 14 appearances in two years with the club, scoring two goals.

He signed to Colchester United in the summer of 1954, where he spent one season. He played in 34 league games and scored five goals for Colchester, making his debut on 21 August 1954 in a 0–0 draw with Swindon Town. He scored his first goal in the following game at Exeter City in a 2–2 draw. His final goal came against Southend on 11 April 1955 in a 4–2 defeat at Roots Hall and made his final appearance on 4 May 1955 in a 2–1 away defeat to Torquay United.

After leaving Colchester, Leonard returned to non-league football with Tonbridge Angels.

References

1929 births
Living people
Association footballers from Dublin (city)
Republic of Ireland association footballers
Association football forwards
Bath City F.C. players
Bristol Rovers F.C. players
Colchester United F.C. players
Tonbridge Angels F.C. players
English Football League players